Corydon is a city in Wayne County, Iowa, United States. The population was 1,526 in the 2020 census, a decline from 1,591 in 2000. It is the county seat of Wayne County.

The town was laid out and platted in 1851 and later that year designated as the county seat. The town was named by county judge Seth Anderson after his old home town of Corydon, Indiana.

Corydon is the hometown of Olympic gold medalist George Saling. Saling won the 110 meter hurdles in the 1932 Summer Olympics in Los Angeles with a time of 14.6 seconds.

The school district's sports complex bears his name, Saling Sports Complex, and the annual George Saling Race is part of the community's Old Settler's Celebration held the second weekend in August. Each year, Wayne Community High School's class reunions are held during the Old Settler's Celebration while the majority of former students are in town visiting relatives and friends.

Geography
Corydon's longitude and latitude coordinates in decimal form are 40.759058, -93.317758.

Demographics

2010 census
As of the census of 2010, there were 1,585 people, 680 households, and 411 families residing in the city. The racial makeup of the city was 99.0% White, 0.1% African American, 0.2% Native American, 0.1% Asian, 0.2% from other races, and 0.5% from two or more races. Hispanic or Latino of any race were 0.4% of the population.

There were 680 households, of which 26.8% had children under the age of 18 living with them, 47.1% were married couples living together, 9.1% had a female householder with no husband present, 4.3% had a male householder with no wife present, and 39.6% were non-families. 34.7% of all households were made up of individuals, and 21.6% had someone living alone who was 65 years of age or older. The average household size was 2.20 and the average family size was 2.82.

The median age in the city was 46.7 years. 20.6% of residents were under the age of 18; 9% were between the ages of 18 and 24; 18.1% were from 25 to 44; 24.6% were from 45 to 64; and 27.7% were 65 years of age or older. The gender makeup of the city was 45.9% male and 54.1% female.

2000 census
As of the census of 2000, there were 1,591 people, 718 households, and 432 families residing in the city. The racial makeup of the city was 99.43% White, 0.06% African American, 0.06% Asian, 0.13% Pacific Islander, and 0.31% from two or more races. Hispanic or Latino of any race were 0.19% of the population.

There were 718 households, out of which 22.7% had children under the age of 18 living with them, 49.3% were married couples living together, 8.1% had a female householder with no husband present, and 39.7% were non-families. 38.0% of all households were made up of individuals, and 24.8% had someone living alone who was 65 years of age or older. The average household size was 2.10 and the average family size was 2.73.

Age spread: 20.7% under the age of 18, 6.1% from 18 to 24, 19.5% from 25 to 44, 21.7% from 45 to 64, and 31.9% who were 65 years of age or older. The median age was 48 years. For every 100 females, there were 82.5 males. For every 100 females age 18 and over, there were 76.9 males.

The median income for a household in the city was $28,542, and the median income for a family was $40,231. Males had a median income of $31,250 versus $18,523 for females. The per capita income for the city was $17,496. About 9.7% of families and 12.1% of the population were below the poverty line, including 14.2% of those under age 18 and 15.4% of those age 65 or over.

Arts and culture
The Prairie Trails Museum of Wayne County is located on the eastern side of Corydon on Highway 2. Permanent exhibits include a tribute to the Mormon Trail and depiction of the Ocobock Bank in Corydon along with the original safe that was robbed by Jesse James and other members of the James-Younger Gang on June 3, 1871.

The Corydon post office contains a mural entitled Volunteer Fire Department, painted in 1942 by Marion Gilmore. Murals were produced from 1934 to 1943 in the United States through the Section of Painting and Sculpture, later called the Section of Fine Arts, of the Treasury Department.

Education
Wayne Community School District operates public schools serving the community.

Transportation

Corydon is served by Iowa Highways 2 and 14 which make up the southern, eastern and northeastern portion of the town square.

Rail service through Corydon is provided by the Union Pacific Railroad.  Since the Union Pacific merged with the Chicago and North Western Railway (C&NW) in 1995, there has been a considerable increase in rail traffic on the line.  The line was originally the Rock Island's Short line from Allerton to Minneapolis.  After the Rock Island ceased operations, its main track between Kansas City and Allerton was combined with the Short Line to form C&NW's "Spine Line" between Kansas City and Minneapolis and that designation has been retained by Union Pacific.  The Rock Island depot was removed in the late 1950s with passenger service provided through Allerton, 6 miles to the southwest until about 1970.

Corydon was also served by the CB&Q Railroad.  The line originally was the Keokuk & Western line from Humeston in the northwest part of Wayne County through Corydon, Promise City, Centerville and into northeastern Missouri.  It then became part of the Chicago, Burlington and Quincy Railroad.  The line was abandoned between Corydon and Centerville in 1958.  The line was completely abandoned from Corydon to Humeston in the early 1970s.  Depot service was maintained until abandonment, the last few years by a mobile depot that serviced Humeston, Mt. Ayr, Corydon, and Leon on set days of the week.  The CB&Q and Rock Island depots in Corydon were just 1/4 mile apart, with the Rock Island depot being on Depot Street at the end of Greeley Street.  The Burlington depot still existed as a warehouse into the 2010's but has been razed.

Notable people

 Karl M. LeCompte, U.S. Representative
 Katherine Marlowe, film actress, most notably in the film Dodsworth
 George Saling (1909–1933), 1932 Summer Olympics gold medal winner

References

External links

City of Corydon Portal style website, Government, Recreation and more
Karl Miles LeCompte Memorial Library at Corydon
Prairie Trails Museum of Wayne County, Iowa
City-Data Comprehensive Statistical Data and more about Corydon

Cities in Iowa
Cities in Wayne County, Iowa
County seats in Iowa
1851 establishments in Iowa